Taganayevo (Tağanayew) is a rural locality (a village) in Starokamyshlinsky Selsoviet, Kushnarenkovsky District, Bashkortostan, Russia. The population was 9 as of 2010. There are 3 streets.

Geography 
Taganayevo is located 44 km southeast of Kushnarenkovo (the district's administrative centre) by road. Novye Kamyshly is the nearest rural locality.

References 

Rural localities in Kushnarenkovsky District